= Pipera Business Tower =

General information
- Status: Completed
- Location: Bucharest, Romania
- Construction started: 2007
- Opening: 2009

Height
- Roof: 54 m (177 ft)

Technical details
- Floor count: 13
- Floor area: 13,300 m^{2} (143,000 sq ft)

Pipera Business Tower is a class A office building located in the city of Bucharest, Romania. It stands at a height of 54 meters and has 13 floors, with a total surface of 13,300 m^{2}. The building features a large sky office on its top floor.
